The Men's 50 metre freestyle competition at the 1991 World Aquatics Championships were held on January 12, 1991.

Records
Prior to the competition, the existing world and championship records were as follows.

Results

Heats
The heats will be held on 12 January at 10:21.

Finals

Final B

Final A

References

Men's 50 metre freestyle